Johan Christopher Haar Daae (August 2, 1759 – September 10, 1827) was a Norwegian priest and politician. 

Daae was born Lindås as the son of the priest and landowner Ludvig Daae (1723–1786) and Drude Catrine Daae. He received his theology degree in 1781. Daae initially worked for the geographical land survey in Jutland for four years before he was appointed a curate in Lindås, where his father served. Daae was the parish priest at Norddal Church from 1804 to 1820, and then in Veøy, where he succeeded Jens Stub. Daae was married to Susanne Grythen (1760–1808).

Together with the churchwarden Ole A. Dahle, Daae was selected to represent the parish of Norddal (including Sunnylven and Geiranger) at the meeting on March 25, 1814, where representatives from Romsdal county were chosen for the Norwegian Constituent Assembly. Daae died in Veøy.

Descendants
Daae had several notable descendants:

 Johan Christopher Haar Daae
 Ludvig Daae (1792–1879), officer, purchased the Solnør farm in Skodje
 Margrethe Giørwel Daae (1825–1887), wife of Peter Gustav Zwilgmeyer
  Ludvig Daae,  jurist, landowner, and politician
  Aagaat Gerhardine Skavlan Daae (1864–1946), librarian and historian
 Anders Daae (1802–1866), parish priest in Kvernes and provost for Nordmøre
  Sara Margrethe Daae (1806–1841), wife of Hans Conrad Thoresen 
  Suzannah Daae Thoresen (1836–1914), wife of Henrik Ibsen

References

1759 births
1827 deaths
18th-century Norwegian Lutheran clergy
People from Lindås
19th-century Norwegian Lutheran clergy